Nuray Deliktaş (born 1971) is a former European champion Turkish female Taekwondo practitioner. Currently, she serves as a coach of the Turkey national team.

She was born 1971 in Buca district of Izmir, Turkey. In 1980, she began with practising taekwondo. After finishing the high school, she studied physical education and sports at Ege University and graduated as a teacher. Currently, she serves at a vocational high school in Izmir.

In 1991, Deliktaş became national champion in her first participation at the Turkish championships in the senior category. Deliktaş took part at 19 registered fights in 8 international competitions and won 13 of them. In 1999, she retired from active sports, and is currently serving as coach in the sports club Sude and for the Turkey national team.

Deliktaş is married and is mother of a child.

Achievements
  1991 Intern. German Championships - Idar-Oberstein, Germany -55 kg
  1992 European Championships - Valencia, Spaink -55 kg
  1993 World Championships - New York City, USA -55 kg
  1994 World Cup - George Town, Cayman Islands, United Kingdom -60 kg
  1995 World Championships - Manila, Philippines -55 kg
  1996 Student World Championships - St. Petersburg, PRussia -55 kg
  1999 Belgium Open Tournament - Herstal, Belgium  -55 kg

References

1971 births
People from Buca
Sportspeople from İzmir
Ege University alumni
Turkish female taekwondo practitioners
Turkish female martial artists
Turkish schoolteachers
Turkish sports coaches
Living people
World Taekwondo Championships medalists
European Taekwondo Championships medalists
20th-century Turkish sportswomen
21st-century Turkish sportswomen